The Spaceguard Foundation (SGF) is a private organization based in Frascati, Italy, whose purpose is to study, discover and observe near-Earth objects (NEO) and protect the Earth from the possible threat of their collision. The foundation is non-partisan, non-political and non-profit, and acts as the international organization grouping together the spaceguard organizations in various countries, as well as individual astronomers and organizations interested in the foundation's activities.

The foundation was established in Rome in 1996. Since then, it has moved into the ESA Centre for Earth Observation (ESRIN) at Frascati. , Italian astronomer Andrea Carusi heads the foundation.

The Spaceguard System 

The Spaceguard System is a collection of observatories engaging in near-Earth objects (NEO) observations. The Spaceguard Central Node—the website of the foundation—manages the collection and provides the observatories with services which would optimize the international coordination of NEO followups. The individual observatories in the system participate in these services on a volunteer basis. , all the observatories in the system are ground-based.

Related organizations 

 Spaceguard Croatia (Croatia)
 Spaceguard Foundation e.V. (Germany)
 Japan Spaceguard Association (Japan)
 Spaceguard UK (United Kingdom)

See also 

 B612 Foundation
 Chelyabinsk meteor
 Tunguska event

References

External links 
 The Spaceguard Central Node 
 Mirror site: The Spaceguard Central Node 
 The Spaceguard System
 ESA's page on the Spaceguard Central Node

Astronomical surveys
Scientific research foundations
Foundations based in Italy
Organizations established in 1996
Planetary defense organizations